Arturo Vivante (October 17, 1923 in Rome – April 1, 2008 in Wellfleet, Massachusetts) was an Italian American fiction writer.

He was the son of Elena (née de Bosis), a painter, and Leone Vivante, a philosopher. The family fled to England in 1938, anticipating the war and the fascist government's anti-Semitic policies (Leone was Jewish). The British sent Arturo to an internment camp in Canada while his family remained in England for the duration of the war.
He graduated from McGill University in 1944 and received his medical degree at University of Rome in 1949. He practiced medicine in Rome until 1958,  but thereafter moved to New York
to pursue writing full-time.

He married Nancy Adair Bradish (died 5 July 2002) in 1958.
In 1982, he appeared at the University of North Dakota Writers Conference.

In addition to writing numerous short stories and three novels, Vivante taught writing courses at various colleges from 1968 to 1993, including the University of Michigan, University of Iowa, Bennington College, and MIT. After publication of his final book in 2006, he retired and lived in Wellfleet, Massachusetts until his death two years later.

His work has appeared in The New Yorker over 70 times, as well as other magazines including AGNI, Vogue, The New York Times, London Magazine, The Guardian, Antaeus, TriQuarterly, Santa Monica Review, and The Southern Review.  His fiction often drew from autobiographical experiences with attention to the subtlest details of reflective observation.

Awards
 1976 Italian Communication Award
 1979 National Endowment for the Arts grant
 1985 Guggenheim Fellowship
 2004 Richard Sullivan Prize for short fiction
 2006 Katherine Anne Porter Award for fiction

Works
A Goodly Babe (novel) Little, Brown: 1966.
The French Girls of Killini (short stories) Little Brown; 1967.
Doctor Giovanni (novel) Little, Brown; 1969.
English Stories Street Fiction, 1975.
Run to the Waterfall (short stories) Scribner: 1979.
Writing Fiction Writing. Inc.: 1980.
The Tales of Arturo Vivante, selected and with an introduction by Mary Kinzie, The Sheep Meadow Press; 1990.
Solitude and Other Stores (short stories) University of Notre Dame Press; 2004.
Truelove Knot, University of Notre Dame Press, 2006

References

1923 births
2008 deaths
20th-century Italian Jews
Italian male writers
Jewish American writers
McGill University alumni
Sapienza University of Rome alumni
University of Iowa faculty
Bennington College faculty
Massachusetts Institute of Technology faculty
University of Michigan staff
Italian emigrants to the United States
20th-century American Jews
21st-century American Jews